...But Seriously is the fourth solo studio album by English drummer and singer-songwriter Phil Collins. It was released on 24 November 1989 in the United States by Atlantic Records and on 20 November 1989 in the United Kingdom by Virgin Records. After Collins finished touring commitments with the rock band Genesis in 1987, the group entered a four-year hiatus, during which Collins starred in the feature film Buster (1988). By the spring of 1989, Collins had written material for a new solo album, which addressed more serious lyrical themes, like socio-economic and political issues, as opposed to his previous dance-oriented album, No Jacket Required (1985).

...But Seriously was a huge commercial success worldwide, reaching No. 1 in the UK and the US for 15 and 4 non-consecutive weeks, respectively. It was the best-selling album of 1990 in the UK, eventually selling 2.75 million copies there and 4 million in the US. The lead single, "Another Day in Paradise", won a Grammy Award for Record of the Year. Collins supported the album with the Seriously, Live! World Tour in 1990. In 2016, the album was remastered with additional studio, live, and demo tracks, and updated artwork.

Background
In July 1987, Collins finished touring commitments with the band Genesis and resumed his solo career. He had scored a series of hit singles with his previous solo album No Jacket Required (1985) and with Genesis on Invisible Touch (1986), and recognised this period as "severe danger of overkill" due to the high amount of radio airplay the songs had received. To combat this, Collins took a year out solely from music and accepted a lead role in Buster (1988), a romantic comedy film based on the Great Train Robbery. Collins recorded "Two Hearts" and "A Groovy Kind of Love" for the soundtrack, which led to his belief that people thought his songs had become "Very, very light. That wasn't where I was coming from." When he started work on his next solo album, Collins deliberately shifted styles by addressing more serious issues in his lyrics and songs with greater depth than the dance-oriented approach for No Jacket Required. Some bits of music originated as far back as 1978.

Production
...But Seriously was recorded between April and October 1989 at The Farm in Chiddingfold, Surrey and A&M Studios in Los Angeles, California. It was produced by Collins and Hugh Padgham, who had worked on his previous solo albums and with Genesis throughout the decade. The album saw Collins use a live drum kit in contrast with No Jacket Required which had greater use of a drum machine. He also prominently used keyboards and electric piano and fewer synthesisers. Collins made a conscious decision not to rely on vocal effects on the album as his previous recordings, including with Genesis, involved the use of a harmoniser and echo and he looked back on this as a way of hiding the perceived drawbacks he had about his singing. In the end, a small amount of reverb and delay for a slap echo effect were used.

Collins experienced difficulty in naming the album. The initial title was Serious Business, before Collins decided against the potential connotations of business or corporations that it may have on the public. As the title suggests, the album is a change of pace from the lighter tone of Collins's previous work. Collins expanded his focus to the exploration of socio-economic and political themes. There is emotional turmoil underneath the polished studio production and many of the songs are unambiguous and unveiled in their melancholy. While incorporating political themes, ...But Seriously does not abandon the theme of relationships. But unlike some of his earlier work, Collins takes a more mature and reflective approach when looking at the relationships in his life.

As with his previous albums Collins wrote the sleeve notes by hand because "that's all part of the personal statement"; the exception being No Jacket Required. He wrote the text on the "Another Day in Paradise" single on the inbound from the album's European press trip in November 1989.

Songs
The album was a departure from the dance pop of the No Jacket Required album. Unlike No Jacket Required, this album was a pop-rock album, but also included various styles and influences, like R&B, dance-pop, jazz, soul and gospel.

"Hang in Long Enough" was the opening of the album. This song was a dance-pop song, with influenced soul and rock. The song talks about ambition.

"That's Just the Way It Is" is an anti-war ballad about The Troubles in Northern Ireland and features David Crosby on backing vocals. Collins had wanted Crosby to perform on his first solo album Face Value (1981), but he was unavailable at the time. The two met at the Atlantic Records 40th Anniversary concert in 1988, and Crosby was keen to participate on the album. When recording moved to Los Angeles, Collins prepared several mixes of the songs that he wanted Crosby to sing on and recalled that Crosby "did exactly what I expected him to do [...] He just picked a few notes out of the air that I would never have thought of". The B-side to the single was "Broadway Chorus", the demo version of "Something Happened on the Way to Heaven".

"Do You Remember?" has lyrics from the perspective of a man whose relationship is failing due to his lover's neglect. It features Stephen Bishop on backing vocals.

"Something Happened on the Way to Heaven" was written by Collins and his longtime touring guitarist Daryl Stuermer. It was the last song written for the album and was originally for the Four Tops, but it was not delivered to the group as Collins wanted to keep it for himself by the time it was finished. While the song was being arranged in the studio in England, Stuermer had devised some chords for the chorus which resulted in Nathan East playing bass on the new parts as Sklar had left for the US.

"Colours" is a politically themed song condemning apartheid in South Africa and displays a progressive rock influence. It was originally titled "Oh Mr. Botha, What Can We Do?", a reference to the English music hall song "Oh! Mr Porter".

"I Wish It Would Rain Down" is a gospel-influenced track that Collins said is the closest he had come to writing a blues song. It features Eric Clapton on lead guitar.

"Another Day in Paradise" addresses the issue of homelessness. Its working title was "Homeless". Among the inspirational sources for the song was Collins's stay in Washington, D.C. while on tour and encountered homeless people by Capitol Hill trying to keep warm and the contradiction of the White House being so close by.

"Heat on the Street" is a political song about the abuse and violence in the street. The song was a Pop-Rock oriented sound.

Collins wrote in his autobiography I'm Not Dead that "All of My Life" is about his relationship with his late father and his regrets to not have more connection with him during his life. The song was a R&B jazz ballad influenced. Steve Winwood is featured playing the Hammond organ on the song.

The album also features a sole instrumental track, "Saturday Night and Sunday Morning", which recalls the jazz-influenced instrumentals featured on his first two albums, Face Value and Hello, I Must Be Going.

"Father to Son" is a ballad about Collins's relationship with his eldest son, Simon.

Additional material
Collins recorded three other songs that were released as B-sides to the album's singles:

"That's How I Feel"
"You've Been in Love (That Little Bit Too Long)"
"Around the World in 80 Presets"

Singles

The album spawned six singles released between October 1989 and November 1990.

"Another Day in Paradise" – US #1, UK #2 (1989)
"I Wish It Would Rain Down" – US #3, UK #7 (1990)
"Something Happened on the Way to Heaven" – US #4, UK #15 (1990)
"Do You Remember?" – US #4 (1990)
 "That's Just The Way It Is" – UK #26 (1990)
"Hang in Long Enough" – US #23, UK #34 (1990)

In Canada, "Another Day in Paradise", "I Wish It Would Rain Down", "Do You Remember?", and "Something Happened on the Way to Heaven" reached No. 1.

Tour
In support of the album, Collins' embarked on a worldwide tour, called Seriously Live!. In total, there were 113 shows over 3 continents and it led to the release of a live album and video Serious Hits... Live!.

Reception

Atlantic Records initially placed a sticker on the CD version that read "Two bonus tracks" which Collins disagreed with and clarified that they were "extra" songs. The sticker was changed accordingly.

At the 33rd Annual Grammy Awards "Another Day in Paradise" won the award for Record of the Year. ...But Seriously received further nominations for Album of the Year, Producer of the Year (Non-Classical) and Best Engineered Recording – Non-Classical. "Another Day in Paradise" was further nominated for Song of the Year and Best Pop Vocal Performance, Male, while the instrumental piece "Saturday Night and Sunday Morning" was nominated for Best Pop Instrumental Performance.

...But Seriously received two American Music Awards for Favorite Pop/Rock Album and Favorite Pop/Rock Male Artist.

At the Brit Awards in 1990 "Another Day in Paradise" received the award for British Single, while Collins was named British Male Artist, for which he was nominated again a year later.

In the UK, ...But Seriously spent 15 non-consecutive weeks at No. 1, including the whole competitive Christmas season, and at the end of 1989 became the third best-selling album of the year in the country after only six weeks on sale. It became the best-selling album of 1990 in the UK. ...But Seriously also peaked at No. 1 on the US Billboard 200 for four weeks and became the second best-selling album of 1990 in the US, according to Billboard. It was the last number one album of the 1980s and the first of the 1990s in the UK and in the US.

In Germany, it is the second best-selling album in the chart history of certified albums, and the best-selling album within the foreign repertoire.

Track listing

CD and cassette

LP
The vinyl release features a rearranged track listing and is missing two tracks from the CD/cassette version, "Heat on the Street" and the instrumental "Saturday Night and Sunday Morning".

This listing applies only to original 1989 releases of the album. Vinyl releases of 2016 remaster feature all tracks and the same track listing as for CD and cassette releases, split between two discs, three tracks per side.

2016 bonus tracks

Personnel 
Adapted from liner notes.

Musicians
 Phil Collins – vocals (tracks 1–9, 11, 12), keyboards (1-9, 11, 12), drums (1, 4-12), drum machine (2, 3), percussion (2, 3, 10, 12), tambourine (6, 8)
 Steve Winwood – Hammond organ (track 9)
 Daryl Stuermer – guitar (tracks 1–4, 8, 11, 12)
 Dominic Miller – guitar (tracks 1, 4, 5, 7, 9)
 Eric Clapton – guitar (track 6)
 Nathan East – bass (tracks 1, 4)
 Leland Sklar – bass (tracks 2, 5, 7-12)
 Pino Palladino – bass (tracks 3, 6)
 The Phenix Horns (tracks 1, 4, 5, 10, 12):
 Don Myrick – saxophone, alto sax solo (track 9)
 Louis Satterfield – trombone
 Harry Kim – trumpet
 Rhamlee Michael Davis – trumpet
 Alex Brown, Marva King and Lynne Fiddmont – backing vocals (tracks 1, 4, 8, 9)
 David Crosby – vocals (tracks 2, 7)
 Stephen Bishop – vocals (track 3)

Production
 Phil Collins – producer, mixing
 Hugh Padgham – producer, mixing, engineer
 Ed Goodreau – assistant engineer (Los Angeles)
 Simon Osbourne – assistant engineer
 Tom Tom 84 – horn arrangements 
 Maurice Spears – music preparation
 Trevor Key – photography

Charts

Weekly charts

Year-end charts

Certifications and sales

See also
 List of best-selling albums by country
 List of best-selling albums in France
 List of best-selling albums in Germany
 List of best-selling albums in Italy
 List of best-selling albums in Spain
 List of best-selling albums in the United Kingdom

References

1989 albums
Phil Collins albums
Atlantic Records albums
Albums produced by Phil Collins
Albums produced by Hugh Padgham
Virgin Records albums
Warner Music Group albums
Albums recorded at A&M Studios